Ian Joseph Gorst (born 15 December 1969) is a Jersey politician who has been a Deputy for  St Mary,  St Ouen and  St Peter and Minister for Treasury and Resources since 2022.

Gorst was first elected to the States Assembly in the 2005 general election as a Deputy for St Clement. In November 2011, after his successful election as a Senator, Gorst was appointed Chief Minister by the Assembly. He served two terms as Chief Minister until he was beaten in a vote against John Le Fondré after the 2018 general election. From 2018 to 2022 he served as Minister for External Relations.

Born in Lancashire, Gorst worked as an accountant before going into politics after moving to Jersey.

Background 
Gorst was born into a farming family in the Lune Valley, Lancashire, England, and left school with A-levels in history and business studies (grade E) and went on to work in insurance before going into banking and accountancy. He was a member of the UK Conservative Party before leaving the United Kingdom. He met his wife Dionne (née A'Court), a Jerseywoman, while she was studying nursing in England, and the couple moved back to Jersey.

Electoral history
Gorst was elected to the States of Jersey as one of the Deputies for St Clement in the 2005 elections, coming second with 930 votes. He was re-elected in 2008 when he topped the poll with 1,112 votes. In the 2011 general election he successfully stood for one of the four Senators' seats, coming second out of 13 candidates.

Gorst was re-elected in the 2014 general election with 14,035 votes (9.6% of the vote share), the highest of any Senatorial candidate.

States Assembly 
In 2005, Gorst was appointed as an assistant minister in the Chief Minister's Department, with responsibility for decisions about migration and human resources. In July 2007, Gorst became an assistant minister to the Minister for Treasury and Resources, with responsibilities including the review of accounting functions, investment matters, internal audit and procurement.

Between 2008 and 2011, Gorst was Minister for Employment and Social Security in the Council of Ministers. During his period of office, a system for redundancy payments was introduced, the income support system was criticized, state pension retirement age was raised from 65 to 67; and a new system for funding care in old age was put in place.

He was elected Chief Minister of Jersey in November 2011 and became the first Chief Minister to serve for two terms. He was succeeded by John Le Fondré in June 2018, when the new Chief Minister appointed Senator Gorst as the Minister for External Relations, a role he has taken over from Sir Philip Bailhache.

Gorst has served as chairman of the Jersey Overseas Aid Commission.

Voluntary work
Gorst is the Deputy Chair of Governors at Le Rocquier School, a member of Le Squez Youth Club Management Committee, and a member of NSPCC Pathways steering group.

References

External links

Senator Ian Joseph Gorst on States Assembly Website

1969 births
Deputies of Jersey
Government ministers of Jersey
Living people
Senators of Jersey
Jersey accountants
Chief Ministers of Jersey